Crémines railway station is a railway station in the municipality of Crémines, in the Swiss canton of Bern. It is an intermediate stop on the standard gauge Solothurn–Moutier line of BLS AG and is served by local trains only.

Services 
 the following services stop at Crémines:

References

External links 
 
 

Railway stations in the canton of Bern
BLS railway stations